Jeanie Finlay is a British artist and filmmaker from Stockton-on-Tees.

Early life

Finlay was born to an English mother and a Scottish father, who worked in life insurance. Her mother encouraged her artistic, creative side. Finlay credits a stay with her grandmother in Winchester during a period of teenage illness as key in her decision to follow a creative path. Finlay studied art at Cleveland College of Art and Design and then contemporary arts at Nottingham Trent University. Her first film Teenland, grew out of making an interactive installation artwork Home-Maker about the lives of seven housebound, older people living alone, in Derbyshire and Tokyo.

Career

Finlay's work includes  a documentary about the making of the final season Game of Thrones, The Last Watch, along with the Bifa-nominated Seahorse, about trans man Freddy McConnell's pregnancy.

Her previous films include Bifa winning Orion: The Man Who Would Be King (about Jimmy "Orion" Ellis) the man many people believed was Elvis back from the grave , Panto! (a documentary about Nottingham Arts Theatre's 2012 pantomime production of Puss in Boots), the Bifa and Grierson-nominated The Great Hip Hop Hoax and Sound it Out, a documentary about the last record store in Teesside which was the official film of Record Store Day. The latter film was an early successful example of crowdfunding, having been rejected by the BBC.

Awards 

 2021 Honorary Doctorate of Arts from Nottingham Trent University
 2016 Sheffield Doc/Fest Inspiration Award Winner at Sheffield Doc/Fest
2015 The Discovery Award at The British Independent Film Awards for Orion: The Man Who Would Be King

Filmography

As director

Feature films
2019 Seahorse
2019 Game of Thrones: The Last Watch
2016 Indietracks
2015 Orion: The Man Who Would be King
2014 Panto!
2013 The Great Hip Hop Hoax
2011 Sound It Out
2008 Goth Cruise
2007 Teenland

Shorts
2010 Nottingham Lace
2003 Love Takes

References

External links

Living people
People from Nottingham
People from Stockton-on-Tees
Year of birth missing (living people)
British women film directors
English documentary filmmakers
Scottish documentary filmmakers